Paphiopedilum hookerae is a species of orchid endemic to Borneo.

hookerae